Polynesian paralysis is a term describing the relaxed lifestyle in the Hawaiian islands and the spirit of aloha reflecting the love of the Hawaiian people. Far away from the haste, anxiety, and impatience that makes the rest of the world stressed and frantic, people in Hawaii live life a little slower and believe that they will get to where they need to go and do what needs to be done in good time. Visitors to the Hawaiian islands can fall in love with this more relaxed state of life and feel the effects of "Polynesian paralysis".

Time magazine published an article in 1966 that describes Polynesian paralysis as a "pleasant affliction" because "everything in Hawaii seems to be soft and warm—the air, the ocean, the sand, the music and the people." Polynesian paralysis involves the ability to simply be still and listen to your heartbeat, to stop and observe a beautiful rainbow or to watch the whales dance with the ocean. Polynesian paralysis results in making observation, appreciation and relaxation a priority instead of getting to a destination on time.

Fashion model Marie Helvin was raised in Hawaii and she experienced Polynesian paralysis in the 1960s as feeling isolated on an island in the middle of the Pacific. She and others often wondered "When are we going to get off this rock?" The Honolulu Weekly published an article in 1991 by journalist Derek Davies which describes Polynesian paralysis as equivalent to falling beneath the spell of aloha or suffused with general bonhomie toward others.

Forms of Polynesian paralysis

Polynesian paralysis in Hawaii 
The Honolulu Star Bulletin describes Robert C. Schmitt as a prolific author and "Distinguished Historian". Between 1949 and 1995, Schmitt authored more than 200 professional articles and wrote several books, including 17 articles in the Hawaii Medical Journal (now the Hawaiʻi Journal of Health & Social Welfare). In the November 1995 issue of the Hawaii Medical Journal, he relates Polynesin paralysis to "lotus-eating". A "lotus eater" generally refers to a person who leads a life of dreamy, indolent ease, indifferent to the busy world or a daydreamer. Schmitt concludes his article noting that life expectancy in Hawaii is the highest of any of the 50 states. In a recent article by Travel and Leisure, the author states that Hawaii continues to have the longest life expectancy in America and is considered one of the healthiest states in the USA. The Travel and Leisure article references a study published in the Journal of the American Medical Association (JAMA) that found the average life expectancy for a Hawaiian from birth is the longest in the country. Hawaiians also have one of the lowest rates of depression in the country as well.

There is no reference to Polynesian paralysis on the Center for Disease Control (CDC) website because Polynesian paralysis is not a disease or medical condition. Polynesian paralysis is usually referred to a mental state with symptoms of happiness, relaxation, euphoria, and a deep sense of meaning and contentment.

Polynesian paralysis music 
Andy Yamashita writes in The Daily that the University of Washington Husky Marching Band play a rousing rendition of “Polynesian Paralysis.” A YouTube video posted on September 19, 2019, shows the band performing "Polynesian Paralysis".

In 2011 the Coconut Boat Band released their third album, Sunsetted, which included a song titled "Polynesian Paralysis" . The lyrics of this song describes a person with Polynesian Paralysis as someone who might be sitting by the ocean in a lounge chair in perfect bliss watching the sunset.

Polynesian paralysis pills 
In 2021, Rx Aloha in Kahului, Hawaii began to market sugar candy pills as Polynesian Paralysis Pills (tm). These pills have no chemicals or medicinal ingredients, but are recommended to be taken twice daily to get a daily dose of aloha. RX Aloha also uses "Less Stress . . . More Aloha" (tm) and "Get Your Daily Dose Of Aloha" (tm) in their marking campaigns.

Polynesian paralysis drinks 
There are several cocktail drinks called Polynesian paralysis. Most contain rum or the ancient Hawaiian alcohol okolehao. Jeff "Beachbum" Berry is a mixologist who has invented and published many of his own cocktail recipes over the years. One of his signature drinks is called the Polynesian paralysis and includes 3 oz. okolehao, 3 oz. orange juice, 3 oz. unsweetened pineapple juice, and 3/4 oz. lemon juice along with orgeat syrup and other sweeteners blended with crushed ice. In his book, Waikiki Beachnik, author H. Allen Smith describes the symptoms of Polynesian paralysis as "a screaming desire not to work or do anything that requires any physical or mental efforts"

Polynesian paralysis food 
Da Kitchen was established in 1998 in Maui and serves creative diverse cuisine with an emphasis on traditional Hawaiian foods. Da Kitchen has been featured on the Travel Channel Bizarre Food Show, Man vs. Food, and The Food Network Diners. Da Kitchen has 2 locations in Maui in both Kihei and Kahului. Da Kitchen serves a local Hawaiian dish called Polynesian Paralysis which contains fish tempura, kaula pork, two eggs, onions and mushrooms with brown gravy over fried rice. One review on YELP stated "Polynesian paralysis moco - now this.....was soooo good. Like omg good, the kalua pork was smoky and flavorful, the fish tempura was crunchy and the fish was soft, the pork fried rice was perfect, eggs, gravy, onions, everything!!! … I think this is better than the Notorious BIG Moco. This one has better and unique flavors."

References 

Hawaii in fiction
Hawaiian cultural activists